is a 1967 Japanese kaiju film directed by Haruyasu Noguchi. The film is about a group of Japanese reporters who discover an infant monster called a Gappa on Obelisk Island. The reporters cage the creature and take it to Japan where it becomes a media attraction. This angers the natives of the island and Gappa's full-grown parents, who head toward Japan to find their child. Its plot virtually duplicates that of the 1961 British film Gorgo.

The film was released theatrically as Daikyojū Gappa in Japan in 1967, but only received a direct-to-television release in the United States as Monster from a Prehistoric Planet. It received positive reviews from Variety and Phil Hardy.

Certain shots of the Gappas attacking Japan were used in the 1991 Red Dwarf episode "Meltdown".

Plot
An expedition from Tokyo heads to Obelisk Island, which the greedy Mr. Funazu, owner of Playmate Magazine, wants to turn into a resort. The island natives welcome the expedition, but two members, Hiroshi and Itoko, venture into a forbidden area despite the pleas of a native boy named Saki. They enter a cavern blocked by a fallen statue and find a giant egg, out of which hatches a baby "bird-lizard" monster, referred to as "Gappa". The natives plead with the skeptical scientists not to take the baby away, lest it anger the baby's parents, but they do so anyway. Inside the caverns, Gappa's two parents rise from the subterranean waters beneath the volcano, destroying everything in their path. Saki, the only survivor, is rescued by an American Navy fleet and brought to Japan.

Meanwhile, Gappa makes global headlines and is experimented on by scientists. To the shock of the expedition members, two giant flying creatures appear over Sagami Bay. The Gappa parents ravage cities looking for their offspring and prove impervious to military weapons. Hiroshi, Itoko, Saki, and expedition scientist Professor Tonooka try to persuade the headstrong Mr. Funazu to let the baby go and return it to its parents. Mr. Funazu finally lets Gappa go back to its parents. Then the three go back to Obelisk Island.

Cast
Tamio Kawachi as Hiroshi Kurosaki
Yoko Yamamoto as Itoko Koyanagi
Yuji Okada as Daize Tonoka
Kōji Wada as Mashida
Tatsuya Fuji as George Inoue
Keisuke Inoue as Mr. Funazu, Magazine owner
Zenji Yamada as Captain of the Kamome-Maru
Bumon Koto as Chief of Obelisk Island
Kôtarô Sugie as Reporter #1
Saburô Hiromatsu as Hosoda
Binnosuke Nagao as Commander Riku
Masaru Kamiyama as Professor
Kokan Katsura as Saburo Hayashi
Shirô Oshimi as Oyama
Yoko Oyagi as Aihara
Sanpei Mine as Islander #1
Takashi Koshiba as Reporter #2
Kensuke Tamai as Islander #2
Minoru Sato as Reporter #3
Kiyoshi Matsuoka as Islander #3
Hiroshi Itoh as Reporter #4
Mike Danine as Petty Officer
Ruich Fidancer as Captain of the Sea Angels
Paul Scheman as Professor McDonald
Hiroshita Atami and Takashi Konagaias as Gappa (male)
Ken Misugi and Shiro Tonami as Gappa (female)

Production

Writing
The year 1967 was the height of Japan's “Kaiju Boom” and many Japanese film studios were doing their own monster film. Nikkatsu jumped onboard and decided to do their own film. Several idea's were hatched but not bore fruit. there was Giant Monster Gigant  
(大怪獣ギガント, Daikaiju Giganto): A giant alien lifeform resembling a spider arrives on Earth and causes destruction. Giant Squid Monster Arkitius (大烏賊アーキティウス, Oiki Akitiusu): During World War II, a Nazi U-boat is attacked by a giant squid called Arkitius. Giant Monster Momonra (怪獣モモンラ, Daikaiju Momonra): Japan is attacked by a giant mutated flying squirrel. And Reigon: Devil of the Seabed (海底の魔王レイゴン, Kaitei no mao Reigon): A giant manta ray dubbed “Reigon” appears one day and wreaks havoc across the world and then fights a giant iguana. This was the fourth and final unmade film in a series of concepts Nikkatsu Company had before making Gappa. This concept got the furthest into development out of the four scrapped projects, receiving a plot synopsis, speculative screenplay, and kaiju ideas. Planning was done by Hideo Kodama; the draft was written by Shunichi Yukimuro and Ryuzo Nakanishi.

Filming
In an interview with the film's screenplay writers, Gen Yamazaki and Ryuzo Nakanishi, they explained that the film got government financing of about 500,000,000 yen (about $1.4 million), which was ten times the average of a Nikkatsu film. Eisei Koi, who was the producer of the film was classmates with politicians in the Diet and used his political power to get the money.

Principal photography on Gappa lasted for about 40 days, twice the time that director Haruyasu Noguchi usually took to shoot a film.

Special effects
The monster suits and effects in the film were created by Akira Watanabe, a former employee of Toho.

Release
Gappa was released in Japan on April 22, 1967, as Daikyojū Gappa. The film was never released theatrically in the United States. American International Television first offered the film as Monster from a Prehistoric Planet in the "15 New Science Fiction" television package beginning in 1967; the film may have premiered on television in 1968.

The English language dialogue track in the film's English version is credited to William Ross.

Stuart Galbraith IV, author of Japanese Science Fiction, Fantasy and Horror Films described the American version of the film as poorly dubbed and that home video versions prior to 1994 are poor dupes taken from a 16mm television print. The film has been released on DVD by various companies including Alpha Video, Mill Creek Entertainment, Tokyo Shock and Image Entertainment. Gappa the Triphibian Monster was released on Blu-ray in the United States on February 25, 2020, with both Japanese and English language audio as well as English subtitles.

Reception
In contemporary reviews, Variety stated that the creature Gappa makes an "auspicious debut and reveals itself as "best monster" so far". Variety concluded that "these are the only Japanese monsters one might like to see again" and that "Most effects are well done, a few superb" noting the destruction of Atami as one of the highlights.

In retrospective reviews, Phil Hardy discussed the film in his book Science Fiction (1984). The review complimented the film, noting that "the effects are excellent and the script is worthy of a witty children's comedy." Stuart Galbraith IV described the film as an unauthorized remake of the 1961 British film Gorgo. Galbraith described the human characters as "colorless reporters and scientists" and that "none of the actors is especially appealing."  Galbraith commented on Akira Watanabe's effects, opining that they were "okay but lack the perfectionist drive of Eiji Tsuburaya's work."

See also
 List of films in the public domain in the United States
 List of Japanese films of 1967
 List of science fiction films of the 1960s

References

Footnotes

Sources

External links
 

1967 films
1960s science fiction films
1960s monster movies
Giant monster films
Films set in Atami
Films set in Tochigi Prefecture
Films set in Tokyo
Films set in Yamanashi Prefecture
Kaiju films
Nikkatsu films
Works about kappa (folklore)
1960s Japanese films
Films about families